After the Ball is a 1932 British-American comedy film directed by Milton Rosmer and starring Esther Ralston, Basil Rathbone and Marie Burke.

It was filmed at Lime Grove Studios in West London. The film's sets were designed by Alfred Junge.

Premise
Jack Harrowby (Basil Rathbone) believes he is drawing a diplomat's wife into an affair. Unbeknownst to him, he is actually seducing the maid.

Cast
 Esther Ralston as Elissa Strange
 Basil Rathbone as Jack Harrowby
 Marie Burke as Lavita
 Jean Adrienne as Victorine
 George Curzon as Peter Strange
 Clifford Heatherley as Albuera

See also
 The Opera Ball (1931)
 Beauty Spot (1932)

References

External links

 

1932 films
1930s English-language films
1932 romantic comedy films
British romantic comedy films
American romantic comedy films
British black-and-white films
American black-and-white films
British remakes of German films
American remakes of German films
Films shot at Lime Grove Studios
1930s American films
1930s British films